San Giovanni della Pigna is a small Roman Catholic church located on Traversa Vicolo della Minerva in the rione Pigna of Rome, Italy. The church was made a cardinalate deaconry by Pope John Paul II in 1985.

Description

Initially a church dedicated to Saints Eleuterio and Ginnasi Martyrs was located here. In ruinous state, it was granted by Pope Gregory XIII to the 'Archconfraternity of the Pietà verso il carcerati, led by the Jesuit Giovanni Talier. The lay organization made outreach to prisoners, including galley prisoners. Pope Sixtus V granted them the right to pardon one prisoner under the death sentence. In 1624, the church was refurbished under the designs of Angelo Torroni. The main altarpiece depicts St John the Baptist by Baldassare Croce; a Pieta by Luigi Garzi; and a St Eleuterio by Giacomo Zoboli.

List of Cardinal Deacons
Francis Arinze (1985 - 2005)
Raffaele Farina, SDB (2007 - )

References

Titular churches
Churches of Rome (rione Pigna)
1624 establishments in Italy